James Edward Kelly (July 30, 1855 – May 25, 1933) was an American sculptor and illustrator who specialized in depicting people and events of American wars, particularly the American Civil War.

Biography

Born in New York City, he was six years old when the Civil War started. Perhaps because of that he early developed a lifelong interest in American history, particularly in the Civil War and in the generals who fought it. His intense studies into history allowed Kelly to bring to his work a degree of detail that makes his drawings and statues noteworthy.

He studied at the National Academy of Design, and was one of the founders of the Art Students League of New York. He worked as a wood engraver, as an illustrator for Harper's Monthly and other magazines, and for a time shared a studio with artist Edwin Austin Abbey.

In 1882, Kelly was commissioned by Oscar Wilde and his touring manager to make a sketch and bas-relief of Wilde for use in promoting Wilde's lecture tour of North America.

Kelly, Daniel Chester French, and Cyrus Edwin Dallin were the finalists in an 1883 national design competition to model an equestrian statue of Paul Revere for Boston, Massachusetts. Dallin won the competition and the commission.

Kelly's first major commission was for the 1884 Monmouth Battle Monument – five bronze relief panels depicting scenes from the battle. He had a difficult time finding models who did not have mustaches or beards – then being worn by most men of that era – so he prevailed upon a friend from nearby Menlo Park, New Jersey, to pose for him. Because of that, a portrait of the 30-year-old Thomas Alva Edison can be found on the  monument as Molly Pitcher's wounded husband.

Kelly was known for his extremely detailed and accurate engravings on historical subjects, often commissioned by magazines. He was a careful researcher, interviewing the soldiers present at the Civil War battles he depicted, and exacting about getting the details right in his works. Late in life, he hoped to publish a book of his interviews with generals and other Civil War soldiers, but there was little interest.

He married Helen McKay (1871–1929), but no children survived them. He died in New York City, and was buried in an unmarked grave in Saint Raymond's Cemetery.

There is some evidence that Kelly made a Bust of a young Thomas Edison in 1878, according to Francis Jehl. Any evidence of this plaster or bronze sculpture is sought by scholar Allen Koenigsberg - a Museum Display in 2013 of the one surviving example was dated to "1900."

Historian William B. Styple edited Kelly's sometimes-provocative military interviews into a 2005 book, Generals in Bronze. Styple also raised funds to buy a headstone for Kelly's grave. On October 1, 2006, a black granite monument with Kelly's image carved into it and the words, "A Sculptor of American History" was placed over the artist's previously unmarked grave.

Selected works

 Statuette of Sheridan's Ride, 1879.
 Statuette of Paul Revere's Ride, 1883.
 Five relief panels, Monmouth Battle Monument, Freehold, New Jersey, 1884:
 Ramsey Defending His Guns
 Washington Rallying the Troops
 Molly Pitcher
 Wayne's Charge
 Council of War at Hopewell, June 24, 1778
 6th New York Cavalry Monument, Gettysburg Battlefield, Gettysburg, Pennsylvania, 1889.
 Relief panel of General Fitzhugh's Charge
 Soldiers and Sailors Monument, Troy, New York, 1890.
 The Call to Arms, a 17-foot (5.2 m) bronze figure of a goddess grasping a sword and a trumpet, stands atop the granite column.
 Caspar Buberl modeled the four relief panels: Cavalry, Artillery, Infantry, The Monitor and the Merrimac
 Civil War Soldiers & Sailors Monument, Philipse Manor Hall State Historic Site, Yonkers, New York, 1891.
 Kelly designed three of the four bronze figures: Cavalryman, Infantryman, Artilleryman.
 Washington Irving Chambers designed the Sailor figure, and Lorado Taft carved the granite soldier atop the monument. 
 General John Buford Memorial, Gettysburg Battlefield, Gettysburg, Pennsylvania, 1895.
 Medallion of Battle of Long Island, before 1896.
 General Horatio G. Wright Monument. Arlington National Cemetery, Arlington, Virginia, c. 1899.
 Commander Edward M. Hughes Memorial Tablet, United States Naval Academy, Annapolis, Maryland, after 1903.
 Relief panel of General George Washington in Prayer at Valley Forge, Federal Hall National Memorial, New York City, 1904.
 Equestrian statue of General Fitz-John Porter, Haven Park, Portsmouth, New Hampshire, 1904.
 Dedication plaque and 3 relief panels: Capture of Mexico City, Charging Malvern Hill, Balloon Reconnoitering.
 William McKinley Memorial, Park Drive & West Street, Wilmington, Delaware, 1906.
 Bust of Major General James H. Wilson, United States Military Academy, West Point, New York, 1909.
 Memorial to the Defenders of New Haven, Defenders' Park, New Haven, Connecticut, 1911.
 Rochambeau Monument, Marion Avenue, Southington, Connecticut, 1912.
 Barbara Fritchie Monument, Mount Olivet Cemetery, Frederick, Maryland, 1914.
 Equestrian statue of Caesar Rodney, Rodney Square, Wilmington, Delaware, 1922.
 A statuette of Caesar Rodney and paintings by Kelly are at the Delaware Art Museum.
 Bust of General Oliver Otis Howard, Howard University, Washington, D.C.

References

Sources
 Hawthorne, Frederick W. Gettysburg: Stories of Men and Monuments. Gettysburg, PA: Association of Licensed Battlefield Guides, 1988. .
 Leach, Anna "A Sculptor of American History," Munsey's Magazine, vol. 14, no. 4 (January 1896), pp. 446–52.
 Opitz, Glenn B., ed. Mantle Fielding's Dictionary of American Painters, Sculptors & Engravers. Poughkeepsie, NY: Apollo Books, 1986. .
 Styple, William B. Generals in Bronze: Interviewing the Commanders of the Civil War. Kearny, NJ: Belle Grove Publishing, 2005. .
 Whittemore, Francis Davis. George Washington in Sculpture. Boston: Marshall Jones Co., 1933. .

External links
 James Edward Kelly from SIRIS
 
 C-SPAN Book TV program about Kelly A 2005 interview with historian William Styple at the New York Historical Society, 57 minutes

1855 births
1933 deaths
American illustrators
Artists from New York City
20th-century American sculptors
20th-century American male artists
19th-century American sculptors
19th-century American male artists
American male sculptors
Sculptors from New York (state)
Burials at Saint Raymond's Cemetery (Bronx)